Tom Hunter Louttit (December 13, 1898 - September 19, 1967) served in the California State Assembly for the 20th district from 1925 - 1927. During World War I he also served in the United States Army.

References

United States Army personnel of World War I
Republican Party members of the California State Assembly
1898 births
1967 deaths